Jelle van der Heyden (born 31 August 1995) is a Dutch professional footballer who plays as a defensive midfielder for Vendsyssel FF in Danish 1st Division.

Career

Vendsyssel FF
On the transfer deadline day, 2 September 2019, van der Heyden joined Danish Superliga club Vendsyssel FF after a trial.

References

External links
 
 Netherlands profile at Ons Oranje
 

1995 births
Living people
Dutch footballers
Dutch expatriate footballers
Netherlands youth international footballers
Netherlands under-21 international footballers
Association football midfielders
FC Twente players
Vendsyssel FF players
Eredivisie players
Eerste Divisie players
Danish 1st Division players
Footballers from Arnhem
Dutch expatriate sportspeople in Denmark
Expatriate men's footballers in Denmark
Jong FC Twente players